Barry Eric Odell Pain (28 September 18645 May 1928) was an English journalist, poet, humorist and writer.

Biography
Born in Cambridge, Barry Pain was educated at Sedbergh School and Corpus Christi College, Cambridge. He became a prominent contributor to The Granta. He was known as a writer of parody and lightly humorous stories.

In 1889, Cornhill Magazine'''s editor, James Payn, published his story "The Hundred Gates", and shortly afterwards Pain became a contributor to Punch and The Speaker, and joined the staffs of the Daily Chronicle and Black and White. Pain supposedly "owes his discovery to Robert Louis Stevenson, who compares him to De Maupassant". From 1896 to 1928 he was a regular contributor to The Windsor Magazine. He died in Bushey, in Hertfordshire and is buried in Bushey churchyard.

Pain's works include :

 In a Canadian Canoe (1891), papers reprinted from The Granta; 
 Playthings and Parodies (1892); 
 The Redemption of Gerald Rosecourt (Serialised, Illustrated London News, 1892);
 Stories And Interludes (1892);
 Graeme And Cyril (1893), published as 'Two' in United States;
 The Kindness of the Celestial (1894); 
 The Octave of Claudius (1897); 
 The Romantic History of Robin Hood (1898);
 Wilmay and Other Stories of Women (1898);
 Eliza (1900); 
 Another English Woman's Love Letters (1901); 
 Stories in the Dark (1901);
 De Omnibus, by the Conductor (1901);
 Nothing Serious (1901);
 The One Before (1902);
 Eliza's Husband (1903);
 Little Entertainments (1903);
 Three Fantasies (1904);
 Curiosities (1904);
 Deals (1904);
 Lindley Kays (1904);
 The Memoirs of Constantine Dix (1905);
 Robinson Crusoe's Return (1906);
 Wilhelmina in London (1906);
 The Shadow of the Unseen with James Blyth (1907);
 The Diary of a Baby (1907);
 The Luck of Norman Dale with James Blyth (1908);
 First Lessons in Story-writing (1908);
 Proofs Before Pulping (1909);
 The Gifted Family (1909);
 The Exiles of Faloo (1910); 
 An Exchange of Souls (1911); 
 Stories in Grey (1911);
 Here And Hereafter (1911);
 Eliza Getting On (1911);
 Stories Without Tears (1912);
 Exit Eliza (1912);
 Mr. Malding's Progress promotional story/booklet for Berlitz Schools of Languages (1912);
 Mrs Murphy (1913);
 The Mountain Apart (under the pseudonym James Prosper) (1913);
 Eliza's Son (1913);
 The New Gulliver (1913);
 One Kind And Another (1914);
 The Short Story (1914);
 Futurist Fifteen (1914);
 Edwards (1915);
 Me And Harris (1916);
 Collected Tales (1916);
 Confessions of Alphonse (1917);
 Innocent Amusements (1918);
 Says Mrs Hicks ( circa 1918);
 The Problem Club (1919);
 The Death of Maurice (1920);
 Marge Askinforit (1920); 
 Going Home (1921) - a sentimental fantasy story about a winged man;
 If Summer Don't (1921) (United Kingdom) / If Winter Don't (United States) - a parody of the bestseller novel If Winter Comes;
 Tamplin's Tales of His Family (1924);
 This Charming Green Hat Fair (1925);
 Essays of Today And Yesterday (1926);
 The Later Years (1927);
 Dumphry (1927)Stories Barry Told Me by his daughter, Eva (Mrs T.L. Eckersley) was published in 1927.
 Stories in the Dark and Stories in Grey contain several of Pain's horror stories. 'Dark' contains the famous "The Moon-Slave".

Alfred Noyes was a friend of Pain's and for several summers they were near neighbours at Rottingdean. In Noyes' autobiography, one of the longest chapters is devoted to Pain.

Noyes particularly admired Pain's novel The Exiles of Faloo, of which he writes: "It is the story of an island in the Pacific, to which a number of scoundrels of various kinds, together with other men not entirely scoundrels but broken by the law, had escaped 'beyond the law's pursuing.' They establish a Club, with rules designed for the circumstances, one of which naturally was that no credit should be given. Gradually, through the original flaws in character, the society ends disastrously in conflict with the native population. There is humour and heroism, beauty and tragedy in the tale and, like all great stories, it is a parable".An Exchange of Souls is credited with being inspirational to H. P. Lovecraft, specifically in his short story "The Thing on the Doorstep".

In 2006, Hippocampus Press re-published An Exchange of Souls together with Henri Béraud's Lazarus.

Adaptations

 In 1992 BBC2 adapted twelve of the stories from Eliza as "Life With Eliza", a series of 10-minute Edwardian comic monologues, featuring Sue Roderick as Eliza and John Sessions as her husband.
 In 2006 Eliza was serialised by BBC Radio 4.

Notes

References

External links

 
 
 
 Author and Book Info.com
 Dictionary of Literary Biography
 Review of Pain's novels The Octave of Claudius and An Exchange of Souls, written by F. Gwynplaine MacIntyre
N. T. P. Murphy, ‘Pain, Barry Eric Odell (1864–1928)’, Oxford Dictionary of National Biography'', Oxford University Press, 2004, accessed 2 Jan 2008

 
 Archival material at 

English male journalists
English male poets
English humorists
English horror writers
English fantasy writers
People from Cambridge
1864 births
1928 deaths
Alumni of Corpus Christi College, Cambridge
People educated at Sedbergh School
English male short story writers
English short story writers
English male novelists